Compal Electronics is a Taiwanese original design manufacturer (ODM), handling the production of notebook computers, monitors, tablets and televisions for a variety of clients around the world, including Apple Inc., Alphabet Inc., Acer, Lenovo, Dell, Toshiba, Hewlett-Packard and Fujitsu. It also licenses brands of its clients.

It is the second-largest contract laptop manufacturer in the world behind Quanta Computer, and shipped over 48 million notebooks in 2010.

Overview
The company is known for producing selected models for Dell (Alienware included), Hewlett-Packard, Compaq, and Toshiba. Compal has designed and built laptops for all major brands and custom builders for over 22 years. The company is listed in Taiwan Stock Exchange. As of 2017, revenues were US$24 billion, with a total workforce of 64,000. The company's headquarters is in Taipei, Taiwan, with offices in mainland China, South Korea, the United Kingdom, and the United States. Compal's main production facility is in Kunshan, China.

Compal is the second largest notebook manufacturer in the world, after Quanta Computers, also based in Taiwan. It is one of the main supporters of Intel's Common Building Block initiatives.

History

Compal was founded in June 1984 as a computer peripherals supplier.  It went public in April 1990.

In September 2011, Compal announced it would form a joint venture with Lenovo to make laptops in China. The venture was expected to start producing laptops by the end of 2012.

In January 2015, Toshiba announced that due to intense price competition, it will stop selling televisions in the USA and will instead license the Toshiba TV brand to Compal.

In September 2018, it was revealed that due to overwhelming demand for the Apple Watch, Compal was brought on as a second contract manufacturer to produce the Apple Watch Series 4.

CCI

Compal subsidiary Compal Communications (華寶通訊, CCI) is a major manufacturer of mobile phones. The phones are produced on an ODM basis, i.e., the handsets are sold through other brands. In 2006, CCI produced 68.8 million handsets and was the largest mobile handset ODM in the world. CCI's largest customer by far was Motorola. Motorola's volumes have been reduced year by year, and CCI's volumes have followed. In 2007, the volume was 48.7 million.

See also
 List of companies of Taiwan

References

External links 

Company website

Display technology companies
Electronics companies of Taiwan
Manufacturing companies based in Taipei
Computer companies established in 1984
Electronics companies established in 1984
1984 establishments in Taiwan
Companies listed on the Taiwan Stock Exchange
Multinational companies headquartered in Taiwan